Def-Con 4 is a 1985 Canadian post-apocalyptic film, portraying three astronauts who survive World War III aboard a space station and return to Earth to find greatly changed circumstances. The film's title refers to the Defense Readiness Condition (DEFCON), the United States military's nuclear alert system.

Synopsis
Three astronauts in a secret spaceship lose all contact with the ground and observe what appears to be a nuclear exchange between the United States and the Soviet Union on Earth. Two months later, the spacecraft's guidance system is mysteriously reprogrammed, forcing the crew's return to Earth.

The spacecraft lands considerably off-course, on a beach in eastern Nova Scotia, Canada. Jordan (Kate Lynch) is knocked unconscious on impact. Walker (John Walsch) exits first and is quickly killed by "terminals" – humans crazed by disease. Several hours later, in the middle of the night, Howe (Tim Choate) ventures out in search of help and a way to escape. He soon encounters Vinny (Maury Chaykin), a survivalist who has fortified his house with barbed wire and booby-traps. Vinny effectively saves him from the "terminals," and makes him his prisoner.

As the plot develops, Vinny, fellow survivor J.J. (Lenore Zann), and Howe are captured, and taken in chains to a makeshift fortress built out of junk. In order to survive, the crew must escape to the radiation-free zones while avoiding cannibal "terminals" and a sadistic military-school student-turned-despotic ruler, and escape before a malfunctioning nuclear warhead explodes in sixty hours.

Cast

Production
The film was primarily directed by Paul Donovan. Digby C. Cook directed the WWN news segment. Tony Randel directed part of the film but received no credit.

Reception
TV Guide gave the movie 3 out of 5 stars, praising the war scenario, the darker approach to the apocalypse genre and the overall disturbing effect of the movie. In Creature Feature, the movie received 2.5 out of 5 stars, finding the space scenes of the movie good, but the land-based scenes commonplace. Kim Newman found the plot of a pre-apocalyptic person thrust into a post-apocalyptic world to be a cliché based on The Time Machine by H. G. Wells.

References

External links
 
 
 A summary review and synopsis of the movie

1985 films
1980s disaster films
1980s science fiction films
English-language Canadian films
Canadian disaster films
Canadian science fiction films
Canadian post-apocalyptic films
Films shot in Nova Scotia
New World Pictures films
Films directed by Tony Randel
Films about World War III
Films about astronauts
Films about nuclear war and weapons
Films scored by Christopher Young
Films directed by Paul Donovan
1980s English-language films
1980s Canadian films